Yassine Meriah (born 2 July 1993) is a Tunisian professional footballer who plays as a defender for Espérance de Tunis and the Tunisia national football team.

Club career
Mariah was formed in AS Ariana, the team that was active in the Tunisian Ligue Professionnelle 2. In the 2013–14 season, he was transferred to ES Métlaoui when he was 20 years old. After spending two seasons with the team, he was prominently featured and invited to the Tunisian Olympic team. He attracted the attention of the officials of CS Sfaxien, one of the most important teams in the Tunisian Ligue Professionnelle 1 who sought to sign with him, starting from the 2014–15 season. From his first season with CS Sfaxien, Meriah was a key figure in the squad and played in many of the team's defensive positions.

Olympiacos
On 28 July 2018, Meriah joined Olympiacos for an estimated transfer fee of €1,500,000, signing a four-year contract. On 2 September 2018, he scored his first goal for the club in a 5–0 home win against PAS Giannina.

On 31 January 2020, Meriah officially loaned in Süper Lig club Kasımpaşa, until the end of the 2019–20 season, with a €5 million buyout clause expected in the summer. Meriah started this year as de facto leader in Olympiakos defence, having a great presence in the Champions League qualifiers. Later, however, there were some games in which he made mistakes, so he was sidelined. On 13 September 2020, he signed a long season loan with another Süper Lig club Çaykur Rizespor.

Al Ain FC
On 28 July 2021, Meriah joined Al Ain for an reported transfer fee of €2 million signing a two-year contract.

International career
Meriah's success with his club led him to the Tunisia national team for the first time by coach Georges Leekens on 13 June 2015 against Morocco in 2016 African Nations Championship qualification.

He scored his first goal against DR Congo in 2018 FIFA World Cup qualification.

In May 2018 he was named in Tunisia's final 23-man squad for the 2018 FIFA World Cup in Russia.
In June 2019 he was named in Tunisia's final 23-man squad for the 2019 Africa Cup of Nations in Egypt.

Career statistics

Club

International
Scores and results list Tunisia's goal tally first, score column indicates score after each Meriah goal.

Honours
Individual
Africa Cup of Nations Team of the Tournament: 2019

References

External links

 
 
 
 
 

1993 births
Living people
Association football defenders
Association football midfielders
Tunisian footballers
Tunisia international footballers
AS Ariana players
ES Métlaoui players
CS Sfaxien players
Olympiacos F.C. players
Kasımpaşa S.K. footballers
Çaykur Rizespor footballers
Al Ain FC players
Espérance Sportive de Tunis players
Tunisian Ligue Professionnelle 1 players
Super League Greece players
Süper Lig players
UAE Pro League players
2015 Africa U-23 Cup of Nations players
Tunisia under-23 international footballers
People from Aryanah
2018 FIFA World Cup players
Tunisian expatriate footballers
Expatriate footballers in Greece
Expatriate footballers in Turkey
Expatriate footballers in the United Arab Emirates
Tunisian expatriate sportspeople in Greece
Tunisian expatriate sportspeople in Turkey
Tunisian expatriate sportspeople in the United Arab Emirates
2019 Africa Cup of Nations players
Tunisia A' international footballers
2016 African Nations Championship players
2022 FIFA World Cup players